Minhla is a town in Thayet District, Magway Region, of central Myanmar, on the right (west) bank of the Irrawaddy.  It is the administrative seat of Minhla Township.

Attractions
 Minhla Fortress
 Shwebontha Pagoda

Notes

Populated places in Magway Region
Township capitals of Myanmar